Gorgyra bule, or Miller's leaf sitter, is a butterfly in the family Hesperiidae. It is found in Ghana, western Nigeria, Cameroon and the Central African Republic. The habitat consists of forests.

References

Butterflies described in 1964
Erionotini